St. Antony's Church is a Catholic place of worship in the village of Kuninji in Idukki district of Kerala.

History

History of Kuninji
Kuninji is a small village, seven kilometers north of Ramapuram which is well known in Kerala history on account of well-known persons like Ramapurathu Warrier, Lalithambika Antharjanam, and great personalities in church history such as Paremmakkal Thoma Kathanar  and Blessed Kunjachan. 

Kuninji is in Idukki District and its border touches Kottayam and Ernakulam districts. 

Kuninji is in purapuzha Grama panchayat and its border touches Ramapuram, Veliyannoor, Palakuzha, and Karimkunnam panchayats. This tiny village is surrounded by tall green hills on all sides and the panoramic scenery is very beautiful and attractive to tourists. The long view from the top stations of greenery hills to Cochin, the queen of the Arabian sea is an exclusive awe-inspiring experience for nature lovers.

Even from the distant past centuries, people migrated settled in Kuninji. Due to epidemics and other natural calamities, people were devastated by this region and it became a forest.  In the 19th and 20th centuries people from Ramapuram, Kuravilangad, Athirampuzha, and Palai again migrated and settled here.

History of the church 
The majority of the settlers Of Kuninji are from the Catholic Christian community. They depended upon Ramapuram and Neeranthanam churches for their spiritual needs. They had the strong ambition for a church here to fulfill their sacramental life. 

They sent a memorandum to the vicar apostolic, Bishop mar Thoma Kurialasseril of Changanachery. The memorandum of the people was carried to Changanachery on foot. and Some devotees gave one acre of land free of cost and six acres of land for a price for the church.

The bishop of changanachery accepted the memorandum favorably and orders were given to Fr John  Arancheril, then vicar of neeranthanam church for further action.

As per order No.990 of the vicar Apostolic of Changanachery dated 20 July 1918 permission was given for the establishment of a church at kuninji as a filial church of Neeranthanam church. Accordingly, the presbytery was constructed and an application was submitted to the government for the permission of the construction of the church at Kuninji.  With the permission of the bishop,  the foundation stone of the new church was laid by Fr. John Arancheril on 27 January 1919, and the statue of St. Antony was blessed and installed on the same day.

Order was given to Fr. Vicar to celebrate Holy Mass on Sundays and feast days on 30/01/1919. Holy Mass was celebrated on Sundays in the temporary shed till the construction of the new church. Order was given also to celebrate the sacrament of Baptism on 21/02/1919.

During the pastoral visit of Mar Thomas Kurialassery to Neeranthanam church, Kuninji parish was raised to the status of the independent parish on 16/01/1920, and Fr. John Arancheril was appointed the first vicar of the Kuninji parish. Permission was granted for the celebration of the feast of St. Sebastian every 27 January, the day on which the foundation stone of the church was laid. Permission was granted also for the celebration of the feast of St. Antony, patron of the parish on the second Sunday of June every year, which falls near to the feast day of St. Antony, 13 June.

Syro Malabar hierarchy was erected on 21 December 1923. Accordingly, Kuninji parish came under Ramapuram forane church. When borders of Ernakulam and Changanassery archdioceses were rearranged Kuninji parish became part of Ernakulam diocese. Kothamangalam diocese was erected on 29/07/1956 Kuninji came under Marika forane of Kothamangalam diocese.

Modern-day Church

The present church was constructed as the Golden Jubilee Memorial when Rev.Fr. George Mulanjananiyil was vicar during 1963-1970. It was the result of very hard labor of the people and the vicar and it was consecrated by Mar Mathew Pothanamuzhy on 31/01/1971

 Surroundings 

As a preparation the church has developed the church surroundings, the cemetery has been developed with tombs, a cemetery chapel, parking area, And parish catechetical center as a centenary memorial.

Developmental Activities

The church has been playing a leadership role in bringing about timely development in Kuninji. Ramapuram – Marika road was made in 1927. In 1961 Kuninji – Karimkunnam road was made in 1963. It was because the land was offered by the church the Government Homoeo Dispensary was established in kuninji in 1974. In 1976 the church offered land to purapuzha panchayat to start a market in kuninji. Electricity was brought to kuninji through the efforts of the church. The library and the post office were established here by housing there in the church campus.

Management 
Ward prayer groups have been regularly functioning in the parish since 1991 when Rev.Fr Joseph parayil was the vicar. At first, there were 5 wards and 21 prayer groups of families. At present, there are 12 wards and 13 prayer groups. Each ward has a leader and five assistant leaders to organize monthly prayer meetings and to carry out various services under the direction of the parish priest.

Kappella and Chapel

St. George's Kapella 
St. George's Chapel was constructed in 1944 as a silver jubilee memorial of the church. The chapel was reconstructed in 1994 as the platinum jubilee memorial of the church when Rev. Fr. Sebastian Kadambanatt was the vicar.

St.Sebastian's Chapel 
In 1983 St.Sebastian's Chapel was constructed at Kodikuthy under the leadership of Rev.fr. Joseph Perumpananiyil in consideration of the spiritual needs of the new settlers in the Kodikuthy area. The festival of St.Sebastian is celebrated here at which people of all religions participate.

Related institutions

Adoration Convent 
A unit of the adoration convent was established in Kuninji in 1961. The reverend sisters (Nuns) render a great service for the spiritual formation of children in teaching and various spiritual services in the parish.

St Antony's High School 
In 1948 the present St. Antony's School was established with Government permission. At first, the teachers were paid salaries from the church funds. Later the school was admitted to government grants. But the grants were meager. Now it is running as an aided school.

Organizations in the parish

Sunday school
The class will take place at St.Antony's High School On Every Sunday after the holy mass.

Other religious organizations

Mission League

YuvaDeepthi, 

MathruDeepthi, 

Vincent De Paul Society, 

Sunday School

Jesus Youth

Centenary celebrations 
The Parish was celebrated the centenary of the church in 2019.

See also
Kuninji

References

External links 
 St Antonys Church Kuninji

Churches in Idukki district
Eastern Catholic churches in Kerala